The Cả River (Laotian: Nam Khan, Vietnamese: Sông Cả or better known as sông Lam or Lam River wikt:藍) is a river in mainland Southeast Asia.

Etymology
The name Cả means "first" in Vietnamese language, possibly alluding to the river's importance. Its other name Lam is Sino-Vietnamese reflex of Middle Chinese *lɑm, meaning "blue, indigo".

History
It originates in the Loi Mountains of Laos, crossing Laos's Xiangkhouang Province, Vietnam's Nghệ An and Hà Tĩnh provinces and empties into the Gulf of Tonkin, on the North Central Coast of Vietnam, after a 512 km journey. The Cả River zone is classified as 300 km by the Vietnam Geographical Survey. The Bến Thủy bridge, crossing into Bến Thủy, Vinh, crosses the Cả River on its Cửa Hội estuary.

See also
 Hong mountain

References

Geography of Xiangkhouang province
Rivers of Nghệ An province
Rivers of Hà Tĩnh province
International rivers of Asia
Gulf of Tonkin
Rivers of Laos
Rivers of Vietnam